Kitty Yuen (born 23 November 1970) is a Hong Kong radio DJ, television host and actress. At 148 cm tall, she is one of the most petite entertainers in the Hong Kong entertainment industry.

Life and career
Yuen studied at the Sacred Heart Canossian College and the Hong Kong Polytechnic University Design Department. She is best known for hosting the variety food reality television series Neighborhood Gourmet with Taiwanese host King Kong Lee.

TV series

Host

References

External links 
 

TVB actors
Living people
1970 births
Hong Kong radio presenters
Hong Kong women radio presenters
Hong Kong television actresses
21st-century Hong Kong actresses
20th-century Hong Kong actresses
Hong Kong television presenters
Hong Kong women television presenters
Hong Kong women comedians